Lede is a municipality in the Belgian province of East Flanders, in the Denderstreek near the cities of Ghent, Aalst and Dendermonde.

In 2011, Lede had a population of 17,882 and area of 29.69 km², a population density of 575 inhabitants per km². The current mayor of Lede is Geertrui Van de Velde (CD&V).

Geography
The municipality comprises the sub-municipalities of Impe, Lede proper, Oordegem, Smetlede, Wanzele, and the hamlet of Papegem. All the sub-municipalities and also the hamlet are crossed by the Molenbeek.

Sandstone
The Lede Formation (abbreviation: Ld) is a geologic formation in the subsurface of Belgium. The formation is named after Lede. It consists of shallow-marine limestone and sandstone, deposited in the former sea that covered Belgium during the Eocene. The bluestone (for roads) and in particular the yellow-brown calcareous sandstone extracted from quarries in Lede and neighbouring areas, were widely used during the 15th to 18th century as construction material for religious and civil buildings.

Sights
Lede is known for a statue of the Virgin Mary, called "Onze-Lieve-Vrouw-van-Zeven-Smarten" (Our Lady of the Seven Sorrows), to which a local legend attributes magical powers.  The statue attracts many pilgrims. The statue is taken around in a procession during a Sunday in June, after the biannual nine-day festival. The local church, built in 1496, houses the statue.

The abandoned Mesen Castle is situated in central Lede. It used to be the residence of the Marquess of Lede. Its demolition was started in April 2010.

Notable people

House of Bette (Marquess of Lede)
 Guillaum de Bette, 1st Marquess of Lede
 Jean François de Bette, 3rd Marquess of Lede
 Françoise de Bette
Julius de Geyter

References

External links

The website of Lede

 
Municipalities of East Flanders
Populated places in East Flanders